Pöyry is a Finnish surname. Notable people with the surname include:

 Kaisa Pöyry (1818–1892), Finnish folk healer and herbalist
 Jaakko Pöyry (1924–2006), Finnish industrialist
 Pekka Pöyry (1939–1980), Finnish jazz and rock saxophonist and flutist

Finnish-language surnames